The 2011–12 FAW Welsh Cup was the 125th season of the annual knockout tournament for competitive football teams in Wales. The 2011–12 tournament commenced on 13 August 2011, and ran until the final in May 2012.  The winner of the Cup qualified to the first qualifying round of the 2012–13 UEFA Europa League.

The 2011–12 Welsh Cup saw the return of Western League side Merthyr Town and Conference National sides Newport County and Wrexham. Football League side Cardiff City, Conference North side Colwyn Bay, and Premier League side Swansea City rejected the invitation to participate in this season's Welsh Cup. Nevertheless, the UEFA barred these teams from competing in the Europa League even if they had won.

Qualifying round 1
Qualifying Round 1 will be played on either Saturday 13 or Sunday 14 August 2011.

North

|}

South

 

 
 

 
 
 
 
 
 
 
 
 
 
 
 
 
 
 
 
 

|}

Qualifying round 2
Qualifying Round 2 was played on either Saturday 3 or Sunday 4 September 2011.

North

|}

South

|}

Round 1
Round 1 was played on either Saturday 1 or Sunday 2 October 2011.

North

|}

South

|}

Round 2
Round 2 was played on either Saturday 5 or Sunday 6 November 2011.

North

|}

South

'''

|}

Round 3
Round 3 was played on either Saturday 3 or Sunday 4 December 2011.

|}

Round 4
Round 4 was played on either Saturday 28 or Sunday 29 January 2012.

|}

Quarter-finals
Quarter Finals was played on Saturday 25 February 2012.

Semi-finals
The Semi-finals were played on Saturday 31 March 2012.

Final

References

2011-12
1